Reality Dream is a live album by progressive rock-metal band Riverside. Its two discs contain live performances of tracks from the Reality Dream Trilogy, which includes Rapid Eye Movement, Out of Myself and Second Life Syndrome. All the lyrics were written by bassist-vocalist Mariusz Duda.

Track listing

Personnel
Mariusz Duda – vocals, bass, acoustic guitar
Piotr Grudziński – guitar
Michał Łapaj – keyboards
Piotr Kozieradzki – drums

References
Riverside Discography

Riverside (band) albums
2008 live albums
Live progressive rock albums